Deh Mansur or Deh-e Mansur or Dehmansur may refer to:
 Deh Mansur, Kerman
 Deh-e Mansur, Kohgiluyeh and Boyer-Ahmad
 Deh Mansur, West Azerbaijan